New Jersey elected its members November 7, 1820.  There were an unusually large number of candidates, 119 candidates according to one contemporary newspaper. Some candidates ran under an "Anti-Caucus" ticket.  Only 1 of the 6 six incumbents would serve in the next term, as 4 retired and 1 died after re-election.

See also 
 1820 New Jersey's at-large congressional district special election
 1821 New Jersey's at-large congressional district special election
 1820 and 1821 United States House of Representatives elections
 List of United States representatives from New Jersey

References 

1820
New Jersey
United States House of Representatives